Banging may refer to:

Slang for sexual intercourse
Slang for attractive, esp. physically attractive
Intravenous drug use
The act of percussion upon surfaces
Kinds of "knocking" or loud recurring sounds such as engine knocking
Banging pots, a form of protest

See also
Bang (disambiguation)